Gilbert Sigrist (February 1938 – 2 May 2020) was a French pianist and conductor. He notably accompanied Gilbert Bécaud, Charles Aznavour, and Barbara. He also recorded an album, Dynamoog, with electronic music virtuoso Jean-Jacques Perrey, in 1976.

References

1938 births
2020 deaths
20th-century French male pianists
French composers
Musicians from Belfort